Catherine Maria Fischer (1 June 1741 – 10 March 1767), known as Kitty Fisher, was a prominent British courtesan. From her teenage years onward, Fisher developed a carefully molded public image, which was enhanced by acknowledgement from Sir Joshua Reynolds and other artists. By emphasizing Fisher's beauty, audacity, and charm, portraits of her, along with newspaper and magazine articles promoted her reputation, prompting spectators to view her with awe. She was one of the world's first celebrities who was not famous for being an actress, musician, or member of the royalty, but simply for being famous. Her life exemplifies the emergence of mass media publishing and fame in an era when capitalism, commercialism, global markets, and rising emphasis on public opinion were transforming England.

Early life and time as a courtesan 
Born in London, Kitty Fischer was the daughter of John Henry Fischer and Ann Fischer. According to some sources, she was originally a milliner, whom either Commodore Augustus Keppel, second son of the Earl of Albemarle (as reported by Town and Country in 1771) or perhaps Lieutenant-General (then Ensign) Anthony George Martin (d. 1800) reportedly introduced to London high society. With a flair for publicity, she became known for her affairs with men of wealth. Her appearance and dress were scrutinized and copied. Scurrilous broadsheets and satires upon her were printed and circulated, and several portraits of her by Joshua Reynolds, including one in which she posed as Cleopatra Dissolving the Pearl, were engraved. Prints from these engravings were sold to thousands of her fans, making Kitty Fisher one of the first "pin-up" glamour girls.

In one famous incident, on 12 March 1759, Kitty Fisher fell off her horse while riding in St James's Park and exposed herself (as split-leg undergarments did not exist in the time period). Scores of broadsheets, ballads, and prints mocked her, playing on the pun of her being a fallen woman. But Fisher was not one to be outdone, and she immediately seized public attention for her own ends by having her portrait painted by Joshua Reynolds, the most prominent painter in England.

Her fame spread throughout Europe. When he visited London in 1763, the famous Italian lover Giacomo Casanova met Fisher and wrote:

“... the illustrious Kitty Fisher, who was just beginning to be fashionable. She was magnificently dressed, and it is no exaggeration to say that she had on diamonds worth five hundred thousand francs. Goudar told me that if I liked I might have her then and there for ten guineas. I did not care to do so, however, for, though charming, she could only speak English, and I liked to have all my senses, including that of hearing, gratified. When she had gone, Mrs Wells told us that Kitty had eaten a bank-note for a thousand guineas, on a slice of bread and butter, that very day. The note was a present from Sir Akins, brother of the fair Mrs Pitt. I do not know whether the bank thanked Kitty for the present she had made it.”

It is unclear to what extent Casanova's account is to be trusted, as similar stories of a currency or bank-note sandwich were told about several other women who were Fisher's contemporaries. His insistence that Fisher spoke only English is contradicted by other sources. It is possible Casanova sought to link his name to Fisher's due to her celebrity status.

Fisher maintained a famous rivalry with Maria Gunning, who had become Lady Coventry after a calculated insertion into the marriage market orchestrated by Gunning's mother. Fisher's rumored affair with Lord Coventry several years later sparked the rivalry. Giustiniana Wynne, visiting London at the time, wrote:
The other day they ran into each other in the park and Lady Coventry asked Kitty the name of the dressmaker who had made her dress. Kitty Fisher answered she had better ask Lord Coventry as he had given her the dress as a gift." The altercation continued with Lady Coventry calling her an impertinent woman, and Fisher replying that she would have to accept this insult because Maria became her 'social superior' on marrying Lord Coventry, but she was going to marry a Lord herself just to be able to answer back.

Fisher's retort to Lady Coventry shows her intentions to marry a Lord and, thus, ascend social class by means of marriage, in much the same way as Gunning herself. Fisher's cynical assessment of the gender politics of the day shows an awareness of the constraints on single women with a mind towards greater social mobility, but also serves as a condemnation of the Gunning girls for positioning themselves to marry wealthy, powerful men, merely for their own means and preservation. Wynne also wrote that "She lives in the greatest possible splendor, spends 12,000 pounds a year, and she is the first of her social class to employ liveried servants—she even has liveried chaise porters."

Later life and death 
The first artist known to have painted Fisher was Joshua Reynolds. In addition to the portraits made famous through engraved prints that were marketed directly to the public, he did several other paintings of Fisher, some of which appear to be unfinished studies. 
Nathaniel Hone painted her at least once in 1765, at the height of her popularity, and possibly a second time. His famous painting, now in the National Portrait Gallery, London. Besides sitting multiple times for Hone and Reynolds, she may have been painted by Philip Mercier, James Northcote, and Richard Purcell, among others.

Apart from the letters of Giustiniana Wynne, she is also mentioned in the diaries and letters of Madame D'Arblay and Horace Walpole among others.

In 1766, she married John Norris, son of the M.P. for Rye and grandson of Admiral Sir John Norris. She came to live at her husband's family house, Hemsted (now the premises of the prestigious English public school Benenden School). Some sources say she settled into the proper role of mistress of Hemsted, building up Norris's fortune and enjoying the company of the locals, who appreciated her generosity to the poor. However, she died only four months after her marriage, some sources say from the effects of lead-based cosmetics (although this may be a confusion with the fate of her rival Lady Coventry), or possibly from smallpox or consumption (now known as Tuberculosis), in 1767. She was buried in Benenden churchyard dressed in her best ball gown.

Legacy 
Fisher is mentioned in the nursery rhyme Lucy Locket:

"Lucy Locket lost her pocket,
Kitty Fisher found it;
But ne'er a penny was there in't
Except the binding round it."

Music publisher Peter Thompson also published a country dance bearing her name in Volume II of Thompson's Complete Collection of 200 Country Dances published in 1764. During her lifetime, numerous books and articles claiming to tell her life story were published, although these were often spurious and make it difficult to separate biographical facts from the myth of Kitty Fisher. She was also included as a character in several eighteenth-century novels, including Chrysal by Charles Jonstone. Paulette Goddard played her in the 1945 blockbuster film Kitty, released by Paramount Pictures. A fictionalized version of Fisher, played by Kirsty MacColl, appeared in the 1991 Channel Four historic musical fantasy Ghosts of Oxford Street.

See also 
Harriette Wilson, a London courtesan during the Regency era

Notes

References
Citations

Bibliography

External links 
 Portraits of Kitty Fisher in the National Portrait Gallery, London.
 

1741 births
1767 deaths
English courtesans
English artists' models
18th-century English people
18th-century English women
People from Soho
People from Benenden